Agnostophana is a genus of tephritid  or fruit flies in the family Tephritidae.  It is considered a synonym to Loriomyia.

References

Phytalmiinae